L2D may refer to:
 Showa/Nakajima L2D, a type of Japanese transportation aircraft derived from Douglas DC-3
 Live2D, a software, eponymous technology and company for 2D animation